Syrnola adamsi is a species of sea snail, a marine gastropod mollusk in the family Pyramidellidae, the pyrams and their allies.

Description
The length of the shell varies between 12.1 mm and 16.6 mm.

Distribution
This marine species occurs off the Philippines.

References

 Poppe, G.T. 2010 Philippine marine mollusks: III. Gastropoda Part 3 and Bivalvia Part 1. ConchBooks:Hackenheim. 665 pp.

External links
Photo of Syrnola adamsi

External links

Pyramidellidae
Gastropods described in 1886